Chilukulri Veerabhadra Rao was an Indian historian.

Rao was born in Relangi village of West Godavari District of Andhra Pradesh in 1872. He worked for several journals, including Desopakari, Andhra Desaabhimani, Vibhudaranjani, Aandhra kesar and  Satyavaadi. During 1909–1912, Rao lived in Chennai and wrote a five-volume History of Andhras, which is a first. Andhra Mahasabha recognised his contribution with a title called "Chaturanana" (meaning creator of History).

Rao died in 1939.

References

Further reading

External links
Andhrula Charitram Part-1 by Chilukuri Veerabhadra rao in Telugu in Archive.org

19th-century Indian historians
Historians of India
People from West Godavari district
1872 births
1939 deaths
History of Andhra Pradesh
Writers from Andhra Pradesh
Scientists from Andhra Pradesh
20th-century Indian historians